The Langkawi National Observatory or Balai Cerap Kebangsaan Langkawi is a space observatory in Malaysia. This observatory is located at Langkawi Island, Kedah and is managed by the Malaysian National Space Agency (ANGKASA).

Buildings and structures in Kedah
Langkawi
Space program of Malaysia